Parzęczew  is a village (previously a city) in Zgierz County, Łódź Voivodeship, in central Poland. It is the seat of the gmina (administrative district) called Gmina Parzęczew. It is often called Paryż (Paris), mostly by students of local primary school.

As for 2016, the village has a population of 5,014.

The mayor of Parzęczew is Ryszard Nowakowski, also known from being a cyclist.

References

Villages in Zgierz County
Kalisz Governorate
Łódź Voivodeship (1919–1939)